QX may refer to:

Arts and media
 QX (magazine), a magazine in Scandinavia for LGBT people
 QX (British magazine), a free weekly magazine distributed in London and Brighton for LGBT people
 QX, a substitute for "Roger" (or "OK") in E. E. Smith's Lensman series
 CFQX-FM, a Canadian country music radio station

Technology

Vehicles
 QX, a Q-type Queens car (New York City Subway car)
 Infiniti QX, a luxury SUV built by Nissan's Infiniti division
 Nissan Maxima, a large car sold as the QX in the UK market in the late 1990s

Other technologies
 QX, part of the Q3A Panel house series of prefabricated buildings
 QX1, QX2, etc., a series of music sequencers made by Yamaha
 Epson QX-10 and QX-16, microcomputers
 QX/V32c, QX/4232 and QX/4232bis, a series of modems made by Microcom
 Alternative name for the IBM Quantum Experience.

Other uses
 q, the probability of death of a person aged x years, before reaching the age x + 1; see life expectancy
 QX, a disease of oysters caused by the Marteilia parasite
 QX Locates and QX Technical Services, subsidiary companies of Aecon
 ⟨qx’⟩, a trigraph representing the affricate /qχʼ/ in the Taa language
 Duponol QX, otherwise known as Sodium dodecyl sulfate
 Horizon Air (IATA airline designator QX)
 Quality of Experience